Title 33 is the portion of the Code of Federal Regulations that governs Navigation and Navigable Waters within the United States.  It is available in digital or printed form.

Title 33 and Title 46 of the Code of Federal Regulations are usually consulted by Classification societies, engineering firms, deck officers on oceangoing vessels, and marine engineers.

It is divided into three chapters:
 Chapter I — United States Coast Guard,
 Chapter II — Army Corps of Engineers,
 Chapter IV[sic.] — Saint Lawrence Seaway Development Corporation.

Chapter I

Chapter II

Chapter IV

|General provisions
|

External links
 Title 33 of the Code of Federal Regulations

United States admiralty law
 33